SS City of Manchester may refer to various ships, including:

, a 2,109-gross register ton passenger liner launched in 1851 and wrecked in 1876
, a 534-ton wooden ship built in 1851 and sold 1860 and in again 1863
, built in 1871 and lost off Ushant in 1885
, built in 1903 and scrapped in 1933
, built in 1935 and sunk 28 February 1942 by Japanese submarine I-153 off Java
, built in 1950, sold in 1971, and renamed Kavo Yerakes
, so named from 1984 and 1985, named Hassel Werder before and afterwards

References

References cited

Ship names